Blazing Arrows is a 1922 American silent Western film directed by Henry McCarty and starring Lester Cuneo, Francelia Billington and Clark Comstock.

Synopsis
John Strong is studying a Columbia University in New York where he falls in love with Martha Randolph, but she spurns him because of his Sioux heritage. Returning west he later saves Martha after her guardian has been murdered, and later discovers that he is himself white having been adopted as baby.

Cast
 Lester Cuneo as Sky Fire aka John Strong
 Francelia Billington as Martha Randolph
 Clark Comstock as Gray Eagle
 Laura Howard as Mocking Bird
 Lafe McKee as Elias Thornby 
 Lew Meehan as Bart McDermott
 Jim O'Neill as Scarface

References

Bibliography
 Connelly, Robert B. The Silents: Silent Feature Films, 1910-36, Volume 40, Issue 2. December Press, 1998.
 Munden, Kenneth White. The American Film Institute Catalog of Motion Pictures Produced in the United States, Part 1. University of California Press, 1997.

External links
 

1922 films
1922 Western (genre) films
American silent feature films
Silent American Western (genre) films
Films directed by Henry McCarty
American black-and-white films
1920s English-language films
Films set in New York City
1920s American films